Romance of the Western Chamber is a 2013 Chinese historical romantic comedy directed by Lu Qi and written by Chen Baohua. It stars Zhou Qiqi, Zhang Xiaochen and Deng Jiajia. The TV series is an adaptation of Wang Shifu's work of the same name.

Synopsis

Cast

Main
Zhou Qiqi as Cui Yingying, the daughter of the Prime Minister
Zhang Xiaochen as Zhang Gong, the young scholar.
Deng Jiajia as Hongniang, a servant of Ying Ying

Supporting
 Song Jia as Mrs. Cui, Yingying's mother
 Sun Jian as Zheng Heng
 Qi Ji as Du Que
 Wang Huichun as Zheng Deze
 Shi Dasheng as Cui Yu, the Prime Minister, father of Yingying
 Ma Xiaowei as monk Huiming
 Ma Jingwu as the Emperor
 Wang Ji as the Empress
 Zheng Siren as the son of the Emperor
 Fu Jia as Sun Feihu

Production
Most of the film was shot on locations in Datang Furong Garden, Small Wild Goose Pagoda, Xingqing Park, and Heyang.

Music

References

External links
 

2013 Chinese television series debuts
2013 Chinese television series endings
Mandarin-language television shows
Television shows based on Chinese novels